Gloriana is a 1953 opera by Benjamin Britten.

Gloriana may also refer to:
Gloriana (moth),  a genus of moths of the family Erebidae
Gloriana (barge), a royal barge built for Queen Elizabeth II's Diamond Jubilee

Literature
Gloriana, the protagonist in Edmund Spenser's epic poem The Faerie Queene
One of Elizabeth I of England's sobriquets (after Spenser's allegorical poem) 
Gloriana (play), a 1676 play by Nathaniel Lee set in Ancient Rome
Gloriana, or the Revolution of 1900, an 1890 utopian novel by Florence Dixie
Gloriana (novel), a 1978 novel by Michael Moorcock
Gloriana, a fictional world in Quest for Glory game
Gloriana-class battleship found in the Warhammer 40,000 universe

Music
Gloriana (band), a country music band
Gloriana (album), their debut album

Television
"Gloriana", the season finale of the first season of The Crown (2016)